Wolfram Kühn (born 30 September 1950) is a German former cyclist. He competed in the individual road race for East Germany at the 1972 Summer Olympics.

References

External links
 

1950 births
Living people
East German male cyclists
Olympic cyclists of East Germany
Cyclists at the 1972 Summer Olympics
Cyclists from Brandenburg
People from Barnim
People from Bezirk Frankfurt